Alexander Kravchenko (born April 21, 1971) is a professional poker player based in Moscow, Russia. He started playing poker in 1997. In the 2007 World Series of Poker, he cashed six times, including finishing fourth at the Main Event and the $1,500 Limit Omaha Hi/Lo event where he won his first career WSOP bracelet. Kravchenko had some other notable cashes in 2007, including making the final table (finishing fifth) in the inaugural World Series of Poker Europe tournament, a £2,500 buy-in H.O.R.S.E. event, as well as finishing 3rd in the Moscow Millions, which featured the largest ever prizepool for a tournament held in Russia.

As a result of his success at the 2007 World Series of Poker, Kravchenko passed Kirill Gerasimov to become the all-time leading money winner among Russian players, although as of 2014, he is 4th.  He is also the first Russian citizen to win a WSOP bracelet.

As of 2014, his live tournament winnings exceed $4,000,000. His 32 cashes at the WSOP account for $2,661,909 of those winnings.

World Series of Poker bracelet

Online poker 
On September 27, 2010, Kravchenko won Event #61 of the World Championship Of Online Poker (WCOOP), the $10,300 8-game [High-Roller] event. After playing in the two-day event in a field that started with 133 players, he won his first WCOOP bracelet along with $345,800 in prize money.

References

External links
 Hendon Mob tournament results
 interview on russian

1971 births
Living people
Russian poker players
World Series of Poker bracelet winners